NCAA March Madness 2003 is the 2002 installment in the NCAA March Madness series. Drew Gooden, who won National Player of the Year while playing at Kansas, is featured on the cover. The game's cover shows deformities within the artwork.

Reception

The game received "average" reviews according to the review aggregation website Metacritic.

References

External links
 

2002 video games
Basketball video games
EA Sports games
NCAA video games
North America-exclusive video games
PlayStation 2 games
PlayStation 2-only games
Video games developed in the United States